Marc'Antonio Verità or Antonius de Verita (died 15 October 1650) was a Roman Catholic prelate who served as Bishop of Ossero (1633–1650).

Biography
On 18 July 1633, Marc'Antonio Verità was appointed during the papacy of Pope Urban VIII as Bishop of Ossero.
On 28 August 1633, he was consecrated bishop by Marcello Lante della Rovere, Cardinal-Bishop of Frascati, with Francesco Maria Brancaccio, Bishop of Capaccio, and Giulio Saraceni, Bishop of Pula, with serving as co-consecrators. 
He served as Bishop of Ossero until his death on 15 October 1650.

References 

17th-century Roman Catholic bishops in Croatia
Bishops appointed by Pope Urban VIII
1650 deaths